The National League President was the chief executive of the National League of professional baseball until 1999, when the NL and the American League merged into Major League Baseball.

National League presidents

Honorary president
Following the 1999 season, the American and National Leagues were merged with Major League Baseball, and the leagues ceased to exist as business entities. The role of the league president was eliminated. In 2001, Bill Giles, son of Warren Giles, was named honorary president of the NL.

See also
List of American League presidents

References

National League presidents
presidents
National League presidents